The 2019–20 LBA season was the 98th season of the Lega Basket Serie A (LBA), the men's top tier professional basketball division of the Italian basketball league system. The regular season started on September 25, 2019, and was scheduled to finish on April 26, 2020. However, the season was cancelled prematurely because of the COVID-19 pandemic.

Effects of the COVID-19 pandemic
On March 8, 2020, the Italian government halted the league until April 3, 2020, due to the coronavirus pandemic in Italy. On April 7, 2020, after a month of suspension, the Italian Basketball Federation officially ended the 2019–20 season. Virtus Bologna ended the season first, with 18 wins and 2 defeats, but the title was not assigned.

As in previous years, Molten Corporation provided the official ball for all matches.

Umana Reyer Venezia are the defending champions.

Teams

Promotion and relegation (pre-season)

A total of 18 teams contest the league, including 15 sides from the 2018–19 season and three promoted from the 2018–19 Serie A2.

Teams promoted from Serie A2
Fortitudo Pompea Bologna
Virtus Roma
De' Longhi Treviso

Fortitudo Pompea Bologna and Virtus Roma are the two promoted clubs from the Serie A2 Basket as they ranked first on the League Table at the end of the Regular Season. They returned to the top division, respectively, following a hiatus 10 and 4 years. De' Longhi Treviso is the winner team of the 2019 Serie A2 Playoffs and is the third promoted club to LBA.

The three promoted clubs from Serie A2 replaced Fiat Torino, which were relegated during the previous season after deducted 8 points by the Federal Council due to financial irregularities.

On July 12, 2019, after the resignation of Sidigas Avellino to play in LBA for financial difficulties, the LBA agreed to play a 17-team league.

Number of teams by region

Notes
 2018–19 LBA champion.
 2018–19 Serie A2 champion.
 2018–19 Serie A2 Promotion Play-Off Winner.

Venues and locations

Source:

Personnel and sponsorship

Managerial changes

Changes from 2018–19
The 2019-20 edition of LBA, due to the expansion of the number of teams (from 16 to 18), will take place over 34 rounds and should start earlier than usual, September 25, 2019. Also, it will be the introduction of midweek matches, otherwise it would not be possible to end the season by June 9 (the date set by FIBA due to the pre-Olympic tournament starting July 3, 2020). More specifically, the first four days of the 2019-20 LBA, thanks to the double shifts, will take place from September 25, to the weekend of October 5–6, 2019. Four rounds in just 10 days.

Due to the expansion of the number of teams, at the end of the 2018–19 LBA season there were three promotions from the Serie A2 and just one relegation. For the next years, there will be two relegations and two promotions to maintain the number of clubs in LBA.

Rules
Each team is allowed either five or seven foreign players under two formulas:
5 foreigners plus #5 Italian players
6 foreigners plus #6 Italian players

Each club can choose the 5+5 formula, that consists of five Italian players and five foreign players, or the 6+6 formula.

As in previous seasons, LBA clubs must play in arenas that seat at least 3,500 people.

Regular season
In the regular season, teams play against each other home-and-away in a round-robin format. The eight first qualified teams will advance to the Playoffs, the last seven qualified teams will be eliminated, while the last two qualified teams will be relegated and replaced by the winner of the playoffs of the second-level Serie A2 Basket. The matchdays are from September 25, 2019, to April 26, 2020.

League table

Positions by round
The table lists the positions of teams after completion of each round. In order to preserve chronological evolvements, any postponed matches are not included in the round at which they were originally scheduled, but added to the full round they were played immediately afterwards. For example, if a match is scheduled for round 13, but then postponed and played between rounds 16 and 17, it will be added to the standings for round 16. In italics, the team did not play any game in that round.

Results

Statistical leaders
As of February 10, 2020.

Points

Assists

Rebounds

Valuation

Other statistics

Individual game highs

Source: RealGM

Awards

Round MVP

Playoffs
The LBA playoffs quarterfinals and semifinals are best of five formats, while the finals series are best of seven format. The playoffs will start in May 2020, to finish in June 2020, depending on result.

Serie A clubs in European competitions

Supercup

The 2019 Italian Supercup, also known as Zurich Connect Supercoppa 2019 for sponsorship reasons, was the 25th edition of the super cup tournament of the Italian basketball. The Supercup opened the 2019–20 season on 21 and 22 September 2019, and it was contested in the PalaFlorio in Bari.

Qualified for the tournament were Vanoli Cremona and New Basket Brindisi, as Italian Cup finalists, while Umana Reyer Venezia and Banco di Sardegna Sassari as LBA Playoffs finalist.

AX Armani Exchange Milano were the defending champions.

Banco di Sardegna Sassari went to win his 2nd Supercup by beating Umana Reyer Venezia 83–80 in the Finals. Curtis Jerrells was named MVP of the competition.

Cup

The 52nd edition of the Italian Cup will be contested from 13 to 16 of February 2020. Adriatic Arena in Pesaro will host the Cup. First eight ranked teams at the end of the first half of the regular season will qualified for the tournament.

Vanoli Cremona are the defending champions.

Eight teams qualified for the Final Eight are Brescia, Brindisi, Cremona, Fortitudo Bologna, Milano, Sassari and Venezia, Virtus Bologna.

Umana Reyer Venezia put it hands on the Italian Cup for the first time in club history after a 73–67 victory over Happy Casa Brindisi in the final in Pesaro. Mitchell Watt tallied 17 points and 10 rebounds to lead Reyer, which started the game on a 15-2 tear and led the rest of the way. Brindisi fought back and closed the gap a number of times, but Reyer was always up to the challenge. Austin Daye scored 9 of his 13 points in the fourth quarter to help put the game on ice. Stefano Tonut also scored 13 and Michael Bramos added 12 for the victors. Adrian Banks paced Brindisi with 27 points in defeat. Austin Daye was named Panasonic MVP of the competition.

References

External links
 Lega Basket website 

Lega Basket Serie A seasons
Italian
2019–20 in Italian basketball
LBA